Bootle is a railway station on the Cumbrian Coast Line, which runs between  and . It is owned by Network Rail and managed by Northern Trains.

History
The last section between Bootle and Broughton-in-Furness was opened for passenger services 1 November 1850, with trains carrying Lord Lonsdale and invited guests having travelled over the section on at least two occasions in October.

Facilities

The station had a coal depot, a goods yard with a shed and 5 ton crane, the yard was able to accommodate live stock, horse and cattle vans. The station was host to a LMS caravan in 1936.

It has retained its main buildings, being the stationmaster's house waiting rooms and restrooms but these are now two private residences and the station is unstaffed. The station clock is original and still works.

The buildings are built from red granite and sandstone. Originally the design was used on many of the stations on the Cumbrian Coast Line but today only three exist.

There were no ticket facilities prior to 2019, but a ticket vending machine has now been installed by Northern to allow passenger to buy before boarding.

Shelters are present on both platforms, with the wooden one on the northbound side being the more substantial of the two.

A level crossing with hand-operated gates (and supervising signal box) links the platforms, which both have step-free access from the road.

The signal box c. 1874 is a Furness Railway Type 1 design and retains a London Midland Region lever frame of 15 levers installed in 1977. and was listed in November 2013 under the Planning (Listed Buildings and Conservation Areas) Act 1990 as amended for its special architectural or historic interest.

Train running information can be obtained by telephone, digital display screens or from timetable posters.

Services 

Monday to Saturdays there is generally an hourly (with some longer gaps in the early morning and afternoon) request service southbound to Barrow and northbound towards Whitehaven and Carlisle. The timetable now operates later into the evening than before since the summer 2018 timetable came into effect.

A Sunday service (broadly hourly each way from late morning until 19:00) now operates - this was introduced at the May 2018 timetable change

Explosion on 22 March 1945 
At about 22:17 on 22 March 1945 a wagon containing depth charges in a southbound freight train caught fire on approaching Bootle. The train crew, driver H. Goodall and fireman Herbert Norman Stubbs, on becoming aware of the fire, stopped the train south of Bootle station. Despite the fierce fire, the crew isolated the burning wagon by uncoupling the rear portion of the train, then drawing it forward to before uncoupling the burning wagon. With the wagon isolated, the fireman went forward to protect the northbound line while the driver went back in a possible attempt to fight the fire. At this point the depth charges violently exploded, killing the driver and creating a crater 105 feet long to a depth of 50 feet.  The line was closed for three days whilst the crater was filled in and the track relaid.

Stubbs was subsequently awarded the George Medal and the Order of Industrial Heroism.

See also
Listed buildings in Bootle, Cumbria

References

External links 

 
 

Railway stations in Cumbria
DfT Category F2 stations
Former Furness Railway stations
Railway stations in Great Britain opened in 1850
Northern franchise railway stations
Railway request stops in Great Britain
Bootle, Cumbria